Martin J. Galvin (born January 8, 1950) is an Irish American lawyer, publisher and activist, and former director of NORAID.

Background
Galvin was born on January 8, 1950, the son of a fireman. He attended Catholic schools, Fordham University and Fordham University School of Law. He previously worked as hearing officer for the New York City Department of Sanitation.

Galvin and his wife, Carmel (born 1956), have a son, Martin, Jr.

Political activism
Galvin was the publicity director for the New York-based NORAID, an Irish American group fundraising organization which raised money for the families of Irish republican prisoners, but was also accused by the American, British, and Irish governments to be a front for the supply of weapons to the Provisional IRA.

Galvin became a publisher of The Irish People in the 1980s. He was banned from Northern Ireland because of a speech he gave that seemed to endorse terrorism. In August 1984 he defied the ban, and entered Northern Ireland from the Republic of Ireland. The following year Galvin returned to Northern Ireland to attend a funeral for an IRA member killed when a makeshift grenade launcher he was trying to fire at a Royal Ulster Constabulary barracks exploded. In 1989 Galvin was arrested and deported for violating the exclusion ban yet again.

Galvin has criticised the Northern Ireland peace process as a betrayal of republican ideals, and characterized IRA's decision to open up its arms dumps to Independent International Commission on Decommissioning inspectors as a surrender.

On 28 May 2016, he attended a commemoration for PIRA volunteer George McBrearty in Creggan.

References

External links
 A Chronology of the Conflict - 1984

1950 births
Living people
American political activists
American people of Irish descent
Fordham University alumni
Irish republicans
New York (state) lawyers
People from the Bronx
Activists from New York (state)